Ubaruku is an administrative ward in the Mbarali District of the Mbeya Region of Tanzania. In 2016 the Tanzania National Bureau of Statistics report there were 32,179 people in the ward, from 29,197 in 2012.

Villages and hamlets 
The ward has 8 villages, and 50 hamlets.

 Ibohora
 Ihuvilo 'A'
 Ihuvilo 'B'
 London 'A'
 London 'B'
 Luhanga
 Majengo
 Miembeni
 Majengo
 Mahango
 Malamba 'A'
 Malamba 'B'
 Ng'ambo Mfereji 'A'
 Stendi
 Mbarali
 Kifaru
 Mtakuja
 Tagamenda 'A'
 Tagamenda 'B'
 Uzunguni
 Mkombwe
 Daily
 Mjimwema
 Mkombwe 'A'
 Mkombwe 'B'
 Mkondogavili
 Msufini
 Mtambani
 Mtegisala
 Mpakani
 Majengo
 Mbuyuni
 Mjimwema
 Mpakani
 Msikitini
 Mwakaganga
 Kibaoni Kati 'A'
 Kibaoni Kati 'B'
 Kibaoni Kati 'C'
 Mdodela 'A'
 Mdodela 'B'
 Mdodela 'C'
 Ng'ambo Mfereji 'B'
 Santamaria 'A'
 Santamaria 'B'
 Ubaruku
 Maperemehe
 Matono
 Sokoni
 Stendi
 Utyego
 Forest
 Mjimwema
 Motomoto
 Tupendane
 Uhuru
 Ujamaa
 Usalama

References 

Wards of Mbeya Region